Edward Kofi Agyemang Amoah known by the stage name Kofi Mole, is a hip hop and afrobeats artiste from Ghana. He was awarded the Next Rated Act at the 2019 3Music Awards held in Accra.

Early life and education 
Kofi Mole was born and raised in Kumasi and attended Armed Forces Senior High Technical School for his secondary education. He attended the University of Ghana to study Psychology but deferred because he had to pursue a career in music.

Music career 
Kofi's passion to do music started when he was a kid. He released the lead single "Mensah" in 2018 which featured 2018 BET Awards nominee Kwesi Arthur and produced by Kayso, the record was released under NGA with support from a social media movement called GroundUp Chale. He was called up later in 2018 to feature on the most talked about hip hop song 'Biibi Ba''' by Sarkodie. The song was nominated for the Best Hip hop Song and Best Edited Video at the 2019 Vodafone Ghana Music Awards.

 Discography 
 EPs 
 Spread the News (2017)

 Aposor Love'' (2019)

Selected singles 
 Mensah
 Die Rich
 Chairman
 Biibi Ba (as featured act)
 Don't Be Late
 Bestie
 Public Service Announcement

Award and nomination

Videography 

|
|}

References 

Living people
Ghanaian rappers
Musicians from Kumasi
Year of birth missing (living people)